The 2021–22 St. Thomas Tommies men's basketball team represented the University of St. Thomas in the 2021–22 NCAA Division I men's basketball season. The Tommies, led by 11th-year head coach John Tauer, played their home games at Schoenecker Arena in Saint Paul, Minnesota as members of the Summit League.

The season marked St. Thomas's first year of a five-year transition period from Division III to Division I, an incredibly rare and historic jump that bypasses Division II altogether. As a result, the Tommies were not eligible for NCAA postseason play until 2026–27 and cannot participate in the 2022 Summit League tournament.

Previous season
In a season limited due to the ongoing COVID-19 pandemic, the Tommies finished the 2020–21 NCAA Division III men's basketball season 7–0 overall, 5–0 in MIAC play. Although they were atop the MIAC standings at the time the conference season was canceled due to the COVID-19 pandemic, the MIAC did not officially recognizing a regular season champion. Per the NCAA Division III blanket waiver issued in October 2020, student-athletes were allowed to compete up to the established dates of competition maximums without being charged a season of intercollegiate participation during the 2020–21 academic year.

The season marked the last season the Tommies competed in Division III basketball. They had earned four trips to the Division III Final Four (1994, 2011, 2013, 2016) and won two national championships (2011, 2016) during that time.

Roster

Schedule and results

|-
!colspan=12 style=| Regular season

|-

References

St. Thomas (Minnesota) Tommies men's basketball seasons
St. Thomas
St. Thomas (Minnesota) Tommies men's basketball
St. Thomas (Minnesota) Tommies men's basketball